Abantis meru is a butterfly in the family Hesperiidae. It is found in Kenya, where it is only known from the highlands east of the Rift Valley. It is part of the taxonomic subspecies of hesperiidae.

The larvae feed on Vernonia jugalis.

References

Butterflies described in 1947
Tagiadini